The 17th Huabiao Awards were held on 8 December 2018 at the Beijing National Aquatics Center in Beijing, China, and broadcast by CCTV Movie Channel.

Hold Your Hands was the biggest winner, receiving three awards, including Outstanding Film, Outstanding Actress and Outstanding Writer. Wu Jing won the Outstanding Actor award and Chen Jin won the Outstanding Actress award.

Winners and nominees

References

2018
Huabiao
Huabiao